David Rankin may refer to:

 David Rankin (American football) (1919–2006), American football player
 David Rankin (artist) (born 1946), New York-based Australian artist
 David Rankin (cricketer) (born 1987), Irish cricketer
 David Rankin (footballer) (born 1960), former Australian rules footballer
 David Nevin Rankin (1834–1900), physician
 David John Rankin (1903–1959), Scottish-Canadian politician
 J. David Rankin, Director of the Great Lakes Protection Fund